The Pakistani cricket team toured India from 8 March to 17 April 2005. The tour consisted of six One Day Internationals (ODIs) and three Tests matches. The Test series was drawn 1–1 while Pakistan won the ODI series 4–2.

2004–05 BCCI Platinum Jubilee Match

Only ODI

Squads

Tour Matches

Three-day: Indian Board President's XI v Pakistan

Limited overs: India A v Pakistan

Test series

1st Test

2nd Test

3rd Test

ODI series

1st ODI

2nd ODI

3rd ODI

4th ODI

5th ODI

6th ODI

Notes

References

External links
 Pakistan in India: Global – Statistics

2005 in Pakistani cricket
2005 in Indian cricket
Indian cricket seasons from 2000–01
International cricket competitions in 2004–05
2004-05